Richelieu was a federal electoral district in Quebec, Canada, that was represented in the House of Commons of Canada from 1867 to 1935.

It was created by the British North America Act, 1867 and was amalgamated into the Richelieu—Verchères electoral district in 1933.

In 1968, a new electoral district was created under the same name which is now known as Bas-Richelieu—Nicolet—Bécancour.

Members of Parliament
This riding elected the following Members of Parliament:

Election results

By-election: On Mr. McCarthy's death, 23 September 1870

By-election: On Mr. Labelle's death, 3 August 1887

By-election: On Mr. Langevin's resignation

By-election: On Mr. Bruneau being appointed Judge of the Superior Court of Quebec, 29 January 1907

By-election: On election being declared void, 29 April 1912

By-election: On Mr. Cardin's acceptance of an office of emolument under the Crown, 30 January 1924

By-election: On Mr. Cardin's acceptance of an office of emolument under the Crown, 5 October 1926

See also 

 List of Canadian federal electoral districts
 Past Canadian electoral districts

References

External links

Riding history from the Library of Parliament:
1867-1935

Former federal electoral districts of Quebec